Marina Mazić (born 25 September 1980 in Zagreb, SFR Yugoslavia) is a former Croatian female basketball player.

External links
Profile at eurobasket.com

1980 births
Living people
Basketball players from Zagreb
Croatian women's basketball players
Centers (basketball)
ŽKK Gospić players
Mediterranean Games gold medalists for Croatia
Mediterranean Games silver medalists for Croatia
Mediterranean Games medalists in basketball
Competitors at the 2001 Mediterranean Games
Competitors at the 2005 Mediterranean Games